William Ransom (January 28, 1826 in Hitchin – 1914) was a UK botanist, pharmacist , archaeologist and , founder of the UK's oldest independent pharmaceutical company. He was a Quaker and owned a pharmacy in the center of Hitchin where he lived all his life.  

Several places in Hitchin bear his name  notably , the physic garden near the library and William Ransom Primary School.

References 

Herbalists
English archaeologists
English Quakers